Team Gunston was a privateer team founded by Rhodesian racing driver John Love to enter his own cars in Formula One and sports car racing between 1962 and 1975. He also entered cars under his own name, i.e. John Love. Commonly the vehicles were entered for Love himself, but he also provided cars for a number of other drivers during the period.

At the 1968 South African Grand Prix Team Gunston became the first Formula One team to implement sponsorship brands as a livery when they entered a private Brabham car.

Complete Formula One World Championship results
(key) (Results in bold indicate pole position; results in italics indicate fastest lap.)

References

Formula One entrants
South African auto racing teams
World Sportscar Championship teams
Auto racing teams disestablished in 1975